Alex Sandro da Silva or simply Alex Silva (born 10 March 1985) is a Brazilian former professional footballer who played as a central defender.

Club career
Alex Silva was born in Amparo, São Paulo.

On 23 January 2010, Alex Silva returned to São Paulo on loan from Hamburger SV until July 2011.

Alex Silva retired in June 2019, aged 34.

International career
Uncapped Alex Silva was chosen for the 2007 Copa América in Venezuela, for which Dunga rested several established players. He made his only tournament appearance for the eventual winners on 4 July, playing the final ten minutes of a 1–0 group win over Ecuador as a substitute for Dani Alves. On 22 August that year he played his only other game for Brazil, starting a 2–0 friendly win over Algeria in Montpellier, France.

Alex Silva was on Brazil's under-23 team that won the bronze medal at the 2008 Olympics in China.

Personal life
Alex Silva is the younger brother of Luisão, a defender who spent most of his career with Portugal's S.L. Benfica and was an international teammate. In his late 20s, he became a born-again Christian, and expressed a desire to work as a pastor or missionary in his retirement.

Career statistics

According to combined sources on the Flamengo official website and Flaestatística.

Honours
Vitória
Campeonato Baiano: 2003, 2004

São Paulo
Campeonato Brasileiro Série A: 2006, 2007, 2008
Brazil
Copa América: 2007
Summer Olympic Bronze medal: Beijing 2008

References

External links
 
 globoesporte.globo.com 
 
 
 Alex Silva at Footballzz

1985 births
Living people
Brazilian footballers
Association football defenders
Associação Atlética Ponte Preta players
Esporte Clube Vitória players
Stade Rennais F.C. players
Iraty Sport Club players
São Paulo FC players
CR Flamengo footballers
Cruzeiro Esporte Clube players
Boa Esporte Clube players
Hamburger SV players
C.D. Jorge Wilstermann players
Campeonato Brasileiro Série A players
Campeonato Brasileiro Série B players
Campeonato Brasileiro Série C players
Bundesliga players
Bolivian Primera División players
Olympic footballers of Brazil
Brazil international footballers
2007 Copa América players
Footballers at the 2008 Summer Olympics
Copa América-winning players
Olympic bronze medalists for Brazil
Olympic medalists in football
Medalists at the 2008 Summer Olympics
Brazilian expatriate footballers
Brazilian expatriate sportspeople in France
Brazilian expatriate sportspeople in Germany
Brazilian expatriate sportspeople in Bolivia
Expatriate footballers in France
Expatriate footballers in Germany
Expatriate footballers in Bolivia
Brazilian Christians
Footballers from São Paulo (state)
People from Amparo, São Paulo